"In da Getto" is a song by Colombian singer J Balvin and American record producer Skrillex. It was released as a single on 2 July 2021, the fifth single from the album Jose. The song samples the 1993 song "In de Ghetto" by David Morales and Bad Yard.

Critical reception
Reanna Cruz of NPR Music commented: "the song feels like an effortless blend from all parties, underscored by additional production from Latin music ringleader Tainy. 'In da Getto' is relentless and bound to keep energy up through a long night on the dance floor."

Music video
The music video was directed by Alfred Marroquín. The video also features Senegalese-Italian TikTok comedy star Khaby Lame and dancer Jeff Obeng's Mufasa character, and follows Skrillex and Balvin on a night of debauchery, drinking and dancing before ending up at a rowdy house party.

Charts

Weekly charts

Year-end charts

Certifications

See also
List of Billboard number-one Latin songs of 2021

References

2021 singles
2021 songs
J Balvin songs
Skrillex songs
Number-one singles in Colombia
Songs written by J Balvin
Songs written by Skrillex
Songs written by Tainy
Spanglish songs
Song recordings produced by Skrillex
Song recordings produced by Tainy
Universal Music Latin Entertainment singles